Oreophryne frontifasciata is a species of frog of the family Microhylidae.
It is endemic to Indonesia.
Its natural habitat is subtropical or tropical moist lowland forests.

References

frontifasciata
Amphibians of Indonesia
Taxonomy articles created by Polbot
Amphibians described in 1883